Athene Glacier is a glacier,  long, flowing east and merging with the terminus of Casey Glacier where it discharges into Casey Inlet, on the east coast of the Antarctic Peninsula.

History
Athene Glacier was photographed from the air by the Falkland Islands Dependencies Survey (FIDS) in August 1947, and by the Ronne Antarctic Research Expedition (Trimetrogon air photography) in December 1947. It was surveyed by FIDS in November 1960, and was named by the UK Antarctic Place-Names Committee after Athene (Athena), the daughter of Zeus and goddess of the city of Athens in Greek mythology.

See also
 List of glaciers in the Antarctic
 Glaciology

References
 

Glaciers of Bowman Coast